Varbon is a village in Moallem Kalayeh Rural District, Rudbar-e Alamut District, Qazvin County, Qazvin Province, Iran. At the 2006 census, its population was 219, in 79 families.  Varbon is located near Ovan Lake.

References 

Populated places in Qazvin County